Lawn bowls at the 1968 Summer Paralympics consisted of four events.

Medal summary

References 

 

1968 Summer Paralympics events
1968
Paralympics